Unica NetTracker was a web analytics application that processed web log files. Unica announced end-of-life and end-of-support on December 31, 2011.

History 
Unica NetTracker was first released in 1996 by Sane Solutions which was sold to Unica Corporation.

The current version as of December 2006 is 7.1.0.

Technology 
NetTracker processes log files in virtually any format using a custom log definition. Logs can be processed from web servers, proxy servers, streaming media servers and FTP servers. As well as processing log files NetTracker can use page tag data to augment log file data.

NetTracker stores its processed log files in an internal database which is based upon SQLite.

See also 
Web analytics
Web log analysis software
IBM Unica NetInsight, successor of Unica NetTracker

External links 
Unica Web Analytics
Example Reports of Unica NetTracker's Proxy & Firewall Logfile Analysis
NetTracker ROI Calculator
Understanding Funnel Reports in NetTracker

Web analytics
Discontinued software